The Chatterton Baronetcy, of Castle Mahon, in the County and City of Cork, was a title in the Baronetage of the United Kingdom. It was created on 3 August 1801 for James Chatterton, member of the Irish House of Commons for Doneraile (1783) and Baltimore (1781), who also held the offices of King's Serjeant, and Keeper of the State Papers. His family had come to Ireland in the time of Elizabeth I: Thomas Chatterton received a grant of land at Ardee in 1573. The family subsequently moved to County Cork.

The first Baronet had two sons, who each inherited the title in turn. The third Baronet, James Charles, served as MP for Cork from 1849 to 1852 and as High Sheriff of County Cork for 1851; he was also a distinguished soldier who as a young officer had fought in the Peninsular War and at the Battle of Waterloo, later becoming a General in the British Army. His only son died in infancy, and the baronetcy became extinct on his death in 1874.

Chatterton baronets, of Castle Mahon (1801)
Sir James Chatterton, 1st Baronet (died 9 April 1806)
Sir William Abraham Chatterton, 2nd Baronet (5 August 1794 –  1855)
Sir James Charles Chatterton, 3rd Baronet (1794 – 5 January 1874)

Arms

References

Debrett, John  Baronetage of England  London 1840
Hart, A.R  History of the King's Serjeants at law in Ireland  Dublin Four Courts Press 2000

Extinct baronetcies in the Baronetage of the United Kingdom